Ramon "Raymond" San Diego Bagatsing III  is a Filipino actor, model and aspiring politician. Having jumpstarted his acting career in the early 90s, he is most notable for the role of Jaime Laurel in the hit ABS-CBN series Pusong Ligaw.

Early life
Raymond is the grandson of Ramon D. Bagatsing, Sr., a former Mayor of Manila. His parents are actor Ramon "Boy" Bagatsing Jr. and Marilou San Diego-Bagatsing. He is the older brother of actress Monina Bagatsing and actor Ramon Khino "RK" Bagatsing.

Acting career
Throughout the 1990s, he starred in several action movies, notably Buenaventura Daang: Bad Boys Gang and Bastardo. He was part of the long-time drama series Mula sa Puso from 1997 to 1999. Since then, he starred in some drama series. In 2019, Bagatsing portrayed Manuel L. Quezon in Quezon's Game. He also played corrupt governor Arturo "Art" Alcantara in an iWant digital series Bagman with Arjo Atayde.

Political career

Vice mayoralty bid
Bagatsing ran for vice mayor of Manila in 2022 under Kilusang Bagong Lipunan with former Mayor Mel Lopez's son Alex (of Partido Federal ng Pilipinas) as his running mate. However, he lost to Manila's 3rd district representative Yul Servo Nieto.

Filmography

Television

Web series

Film

Awards and nominations

References

External links
 

1971 births
Living people
Filipino people of Indian descent
Filipino male television actors
People from Las Piñas
People from Tondo, Manila
Male actors from Manila
Raymond Bagatsing
Filipino male film actors
ABS-CBN personalities
GMA Network personalities
TV5 (Philippine TV network) personalities